The 1950 Kansas gubernatorial election was held on November 7, 1950. Republican nominee Edward F. Arn defeated Democratic nominee Kenneth T. Anderson with 53.77% of the vote.

Primary elections
Primary elections were held on August 1, 1950.

Democratic primary

Candidates 
Kenneth T. Anderson
John A. Potucek
August F. Koch

Results

Republican primary

Candidates
Edward F. Arn, Associate Justice of the Kansas Supreme Court
Willard Mayberry
Frank L. Hagaman, incumbent Lieutenant Governor
Kathryn K. Hitchings

Results

General election

Candidates
Major party candidates 
Edward F. Arn, Republican
Kenneth T. Anderson, Democratic

Other candidates
C. Floyd Hester, Prohibition
W. W. Tamplin, Socialist

Results

References

1950
Kansas
Gubernatorial